Bologni Gracin Bakumanya (born July 27, 1997) is a Congolese professional basketball player for CB Zamora in LEB Plata. In 2013, he arrived in the United States for the first time and attended Pantego Christian Academy in Arlington, Texas, before returning to Europe in 2014.

Early life and career
Discovered in his native Kinshasa, the capital of the Democratic Republic of the Congo, Bakumanya started his career in Spain with Torrelodones in the summer of 2011. After playing well at the junior level throughout his two-plus year stint in Spain, he was brought to the United States in 2013 to attend a prep school. In the spring of 2013, Bakumanya was reportedly connected to St. Anthony High School in New Jersey and the Montverde Academy in Florida, but ultimately enrolled at Pantego Christian Academy in Arlington, Texas. Before long, Bakumanya found himself back in Europe as his English simply wasn't up to par at the time. He briefly resided in Belgium before joining Antibes Sharks in 2014.

Professional career
Between 2014 and 2016, Bakumanya spent the majority of the time with Antibes Espoirs, the junior team of Antibes Sharks. In the 2015–16 season, Bakumanya averaged 14.3 points and 8.5 rebounds in 30 games with Antibes Espoirs. He also managed two games with Antibes Sharks in the LNB Pro A, with both appearances coming in December 2015.

Bakumanya went undrafted in the 2016 NBA draft as an international early entry candidate. In July 2016, he joined the Houston Rockets for the 2016 NBA Summer League. He appeared in two games for the Rockets, but failed to score. On September 25, 2016, he signed with the Phoenix Suns for training camp. He was later waived by the Suns on October 10. On October 31, he was acquired by the Northern Arizona Suns of the NBA Development League as an affiliate player of Phoenix. He made his debut for Northern Arizona on November 18, recording five points and five rebounds in 13 minutes of action in a 92–80 win over the Salt Lake City Stars.

On August 23, 2017, Bakumanya was selected by the Wisconsin Herd in the NBA G League expansion draft.

On March 2, 2020, Bakumanya signed with Ferroviário de Maputo of the Basketball Africa League (BAL). However, the season was postponed due to the COVID-19 pandemic and he did not join Maputo.

In November 2021, Bakumanya signed with CB Zamora.

See also 
 List of foreign basketball players in Serbia

References

External links
Gracin Bakumanya at fiba.com
Gracin Bakumanya at lnb.fr 
Gracin Bakumanya at draftexpress.com
Gracin Bakumanya at nbadraft.net

1997 births
Living people
Basketball League of Serbia players
Centers (basketball)
Democratic Republic of the Congo emigrants to the United States
Democratic Republic of the Congo expatriate basketball people in France
Democratic Republic of the Congo expatriate basketball people in the United States
Democratic Republic of the Congo men's basketball players
Expatriate basketball people in Serbia
KK Spartak Subotica players
KK Vrijednosnice Osijek players
Northern Arizona Suns players
Olympique Antibes basketball players
Basketball players from Kinshasa
Wisconsin Herd players